Villanus was a Benedictine Bishop of Gubbio. Born in Gubbio, Villanus entered religious life by entering the Benedictine monastery, at Fort-Avellana, before in 1206, being appointed Bishop of Gubbio.

References

1237 deaths
People from Gubbio
Italian saints
13th-century Christian saints
Italian Benedictines
Year of birth unknown